Koprivnički Ivanec is a municipality in Koprivnica-Križevci County in Croatia.

According to the 2001 census, there are 2,361 inhabitants in the area, in the following settlements:
 Botinovec, population 176
 Goričko, population 141
 Koprivnički Ivanec, population 1,193
 Kunovec, population 488
 Pustakovec, population 123

Croats form an absolute majority (99.15%).

History
In the late 19th century and 20th century, Koprivnički Ivanec was part of Varaždin County of the Kingdom of Croatia-Slavonia.

References

Municipalities of Croatia
Populated places in Koprivnica-Križevci County